Cesáreo Victorino Ramírez (8 February 1947 – 19 June 1999) was a Mexican footballer who competed in the 1968 Summer Olympics.

After his active career, Victorino worked as a coach. He recently trained a young team from CF Pachuca. On 19 June 1999 he was on a bus trip to Acapulco with a team trained by him to complete a friendship game. In the immediate vicinity of the city of Cuernavaca the bus failed. There were 15 injured and five death victims, including Cesáreo Victorino.

References

1947 births
1999 deaths
Footballers from Mexico City
Association football forwards
Olympic footballers of Mexico
Footballers at the 1968 Summer Olympics
Cruz Azul footballers
Mexican footballers
Road incident deaths in Mexico